Cuba first competed at the Paralympic Games in 1992. It has participated in every Summer Paralympics since then, but has never taken part in the Winter Paralympics. The country has won a total of 43 gold, 20 silver, and 28 bronze medals.

Medals by Games

Medals by sport

Medalists

Multi-medalists
Athletes who have won at least three medals. Bold athletes are athletes who are still active.

See also
Cuba at the Olympics
All-time Paralympic Games medal table

References

 
Disability in Cuba